Lina Mendoni (born 1 April 1960) is a Greek politician. Since 9 July 2019, she has served as Minister of Culture and Sports in the cabinet of Kyriakos Mitsotakis.

She has a PhD in archaeology from the National and Kapodistrian University of Athens.

References 

1960 births
Living people
Politicians from Athens
Culture ministers of Greece
Women government ministers of Greece
National and Kapodistrian University of Athens alumni